Kenneth Francis Walker (born February 28, 1924) is a British-born Canadian medical writer, celebrity doctor, and retired obstetrician and gynecologist. As an author and columnist he publishes under the pen name W. Gifford-Jones, M.D..

Background
Walker was born in 1924 in Croydon, England. His family moved to Canada when he was 4, settling in Niagara Falls, Ontario.

Walker earned his undergraduate degree from the University of Toronto and graduated from Harvard Medical School in 1950.

Author and columnist
He adopted the Gifford-Jones pseudonym when he wrote his first book in 1961, Hysterectomy: A Book for the Patient, due to the College of Physicians and Surgeons which ruled he could not publish a medical book under his own name as this would constitute advertising for patients and was not permitted under the college's rules. He went on to publish several more books under his pen name and used it when he launched his column, "The Doctor Game" in 1975 in the Globe and Mail in 1975. It was syndicated to over 40 newspapers by the end of the 1970s. 

The column appeared in the Globe and Mail until 1989 when it moved to the Toronto Sun. At its peak it was syndicated to over 85 newspapers in Canada, 300 newspapers in the United States, including the Chicago Sun-Times, and newspapers in Europe. He has also written nine books, has been a senior editor of Canadian Doctor magazine, and was a regular contributor to Fifty Plus magazine.

The Postmedia chain, including the Toronto Sun discontinued the Gifford-Jones column at the end of 2019. It continues to be published online and in some other newspapers such as the Westerly Sun and the Prince Albert Daily Herald and has been co-authored with his daughter, Diana, since 2020.

Campaigns and advocacy
While practicing in Niagara Falls, Ontario, Walker was an advocate of women's right to choose abortion and was an abortion practitioner in the area after the procedure became legal in 1969, resulting in death threats from abortion opponents.

In 1979, he began campaigning for the legalization of heroin as a painkiller for terminal cancer patients through his column, by creating the Gifford-Jones Foundation to raise money for the campaign and through newspaper advertisements and collecting 30,000 names on a petition and soliciting 20,000 letters from his readers in support of his efforts.

Walker has also advocated the right to assisted suicide and euthanasia and is a member of the physicians advisory council of Dying with Dignity Canada.

Controversies
In 1986, Walker participated in a "fact finding" tour of South Africa sponsored by the apartheid government. Upon his return he wrote an op-ed in the Globe and Mail titled "The good side of white South Africa" which opposed sanctions against or disinvestment from South Africa and also opposed the prospect of ending white minority rule in the country.

In 2018, the Toronto Sun pulled a Gifford-Jones column from its website following an outcry over its urging readers to consider "both sides of the vaccine debate". Sun editor Adrienne Batra said it was removed from the newspaper's website after medical professionals pointed out inaccuracies in the column. By 2021, Gifford-Jones was taking a stronger position in favor of vaccination writing "I have never been against vaccination and proven science" and in regards towards COVID-19 vaccines "the risk is so, so minimal versus the risk of dying unvaccinated".

Later life
Walker retired from his practice at the age of 87 and currently lives in Toronto's Harbourfront neighbourhood with his wife of more than 60 years.

Bibliography
90+ How I Got There! by W. Gifford-Jones, M.D., 2015
What I Learned as a Medical Journalist: a collection of columns by W. Gifford-Jones, M.D., 2013
You’re Going to do What?: The Memoir of Dr. W. Gifford-Jones by W. Gifford-Jones, M.D., 2000, ECW Press
The Healthy Barmaid by W. Gifford-Jones, M.D., 1995, ECW Press
Medical Survival by W. Gifford-Jones, M.D., 1985, Methuen
What Every Woman Should Know About Hysterectomy by W. Gifford-Jones, M.D., 1977, Funk & Wagnalls, New York
The Doctor Game by W. Gifford-Jones, M.D., 1975, McClelland & Stewart
On Being A Woman – The Modern Woman’s Guide to Gynecology by W. Gifford-Jones, M.D., 1969, Book of the Month Club selection (Canada and U.S.)
Hysterectomy? - A Book for the Patient by W. Gifford-Jones, M.D., 1961, University of Toronto Press

References

External links
W. Gifford-Jones, MD website

Living people
Canadian columnists
Canadian medical writers
People in alternative medicine
Canadian gynaecologists
Canadian obstetricians
The Globe and Mail columnists
1924 births
Canadian health and wellness writers
Canadian abortion providers
University of Toronto alumni
Harvard Medical School alumni
Pseudonymous writers
Toronto Sun people
Celebrity doctors
British emigrants to Canada